The European Union of Jewish Students (EUJS) is an umbrella organization for 34 national Jewish student unions in Europe and the Post-Soviet states, representing over 200,000 Jewish students.

International Memberships

EUJS is a constituent member of the European Youth Forum, the leading platform for more than 90 national youth councils and international NGOs, and is the only Jewish organization represented at that level.  It is supported by the Council of Europe, the European Commission, and is a member of the World Union of Jewish Students (WUJS). EUJS is one of the largest international student organizations worldwide and the first Jewish Youth NGO to obtain the special Consultative Status to the ECOSOC of the United Nations. Its annual programming includes the largest annual event for Jewish youth in Europe Summer University, as well as international, inter-religious, inter-generational seminars, and study sessions at the European Youth Centre.

Full members status is held to the European Youth Forum (YFJ) which operates within the Council of Europe and European Union areas and works closely with both these bodies.

History of EUJS

In February 1978 in Grenoble one hundred and fifty European Jewish Students developed and approved a constitution and created a plan of action meant to cover all aspects of modern European Jewish student life.

Moving to Brussels in 1978, EUJS first opened an office (near Porte de Namur) and in 1980 moved to its current premises at the Université Libre de Bruxelles.

Relationship with Soviet Jews

The struggle for participation in the World Youth Festival in Moscow was the beginning of a series of activities of efforts for Soviet Jewry. On November 17, 1985, Ronald Reagan and Mikhail Gorbachev met in Geneva, and around 75 Jewish students, amongst them students from the UK and the Netherlands, demonstrated in solidarity
with the Soviet Jewry.
Subsequently, in April 1986, the Conference on Security and Cooperation in Europe (CSCE) took place in Bern, Switzerland. EUJS used this occasion to organize—in
cooperation with the Swiss Union of Jewish Students (SUJS)—a special Seder in honor of the Jews of the Soviet Union in the Bern Synagogue. Student representatives from Sweden, Belgium and Switzerland were joined by several national delegates to the CSCE meeting. In addition to the activities staged in Bern, the EUJS encouraged its national member unions to lobby their respective foreign ministries throughout the CSCE meeting so as to raise the case of Soviet Jewry.

2001 World Conference Against Racism

A delegation of EUJS students, led by then President Joelle Fiss, joined the World Union of Jewish Students (WUJS) and the South African Union of Jewish Students (SAUJS) at the World Conference Against Racism in Durban from August 26 until September 7
2001. The EUJS delegates were present at the Youth Summit, the NGO Forum and the Governmental Conference. The event—in addition to spurring EUJS delegates to action on site—led to EUJS signing a common declaration with the Roma student delegation, setting forth the possibility of a partnership to promote Holocaust education, and subsequently resulting in an EUJS-led seminar in Budapest in November 2003.
During the Youth Summit at Durban, EUJS, together with WUJS and SAUJS, put forward a proposal calling for an end of the violence on both sides of the Israeli-Palestinian conflict.
The proposal condemned the use of violence and called for students to take an active role in advocating peace in the region. A group led by a delegation of Palestinians students voted down this proposal.
During the governmental conference, EUJS met with political leaders such as Louis Michel, the Belgian Minister of Foreign Affairs and Walter Schwimmer, the Secretary
General of the Council of Europe.

The Austrian Far Right

In February 2000, the ultra-right Freedom Party FPÖ (Freiheitliche Partei Österreichs), entered into a coalition government in Austria. Led by Jörg Haider, the party praised Hitler's employment policy. Haider was well known for his numerous anti-Semitic and xenophobic statements. EUJS organized a large demonstration in parallel to a leadership seminar that it was conducting at the Council of Europe in Strasbourg.
Students walked in front of the European Parliament and the Council of Europe to the Austrian embassy where they lit candles and threw toothbrushes in the mailbox in order to remind Austrians how Jews had to clean the sidewalk with toothbrushes during the Anschluss.

Brussels

During one of the most violent periods of the second Intifada, many Jewish organizations and communities came together and organized demonstrations against anti-Semitism.
One of the most visible demonstrations was held in Brussels in April 2002. EUJS sent a delegation of students to these demonstrations.

Members

References

External links
 

Jewish youth organizations
Jewish political organizations
Jewish organizations based in Europe
Zionist organizations
Political advocacy groups in Europe
European student religious organizations
Ethnic student organizations
International Jewish organizations